Huvafen Fushi (Nakachcchaafushi) is a private resort island in the North Malé atoll, Kaafu, Maldives Indian Ocean. Situated near the capital Malé and 30 minutes by speedboat from Malé International Airport, it opened in July 2004 and consists of a single island with 43 bungalows.

Uninhabited islands of the Maldives
Resorts in the Maldives

fr:Nakachchaafushi